Dale, Virginia (1917–1994) is the American actress Virginia Dale.

See also 
 Places in Virginia with names involving "Dale"